Microgadus proximus, also commonly known as Pacific tomcod, is a type of cod fish found in North American coastal waters from the southeastern Bering Sea to central California.

Their diet of the Pacific tomcod includes anchovies, shrimp, worms, and other small marine invertebrates.

Pacific tomcod are occasionally taken by recreational anglers. This is usually incidental to fishing for other species of fish as they are relatively small in size.

References

Pacific tomcod
Fish of the Pacific Ocean
Western North American coastal fauna
Pacific tomcod